Million Dollars Snatch (七百萬元大劫案, Qi bai wan yuan da jie an, lit. "Seven Million Dollar Robbery") also known as Kung Fu Sting is a 1976 Hong Kong crime thriller neo-noir film directed by Ng See-Yuen.

Plot 
Chan Ah-sang, a career criminal, engineers a bank robbery to be carried out by a gang of seven recruited hoodlums, all led by Chan. The robbery goes off without a hitch, and Chan's gang make off with seven million dollars. A special police unit is then formed to investigate the case, with the chief inspector suspecting Chan and beginning to keep him under surveillance. In order to stay undetected, each member is specifically ordered to not spend their share of the one million HK$ from the heist for six months, as to not attract suspicion from the police, which proves to be too much of a temptation for the rest of the gang, causing the police to track them down, arrest all the criminals, and return the stolen money to the bank.

Cast 

 Chang Kung as Inspector Lee
 Lin Wen-Wei as Robber Chan Ah-sang
 Hoh Gong-Lun as Robber Kwok Cheung
 Lau Hok-Nin as Biker robber
 John Cheung Ng-Long as Robber Tang Lik
 Tam Wing-Git as Robber Lou Zai
 Chan Hung-Gaai as Robber Yik Yat-Hoi
 Addy Sung Gam-Loi as Robber Tai Sai-Ciu
 Lee Hoi-Sang as Detective
 Mak Wa-Mei as Chan's girlfriend
 Na Na as Lou's girlfriend
 Fung Ging-Man as Dai's neighbour
 Lau Kwok-Shing as Robber Saa Daam-Seng
 Wong Kwok-Leung as Luk Zai

Production and Release 
Million Dollars Snatch was loosely based on the real life robbery of an armored car for the Hang Seng Bank in 1975, where 75 Million HK$ was stolen, roughly equivalent to USD $10,000,000 at the time.

The film was produced by the Dak Lee Moving Picture Company, with Ng See-Yuen acting as a director for hire shortly after the formation of his company, Seasonal Film Corporation in 1975. In Hong Kong, the film was a modest box office success, and was a major inspiration for other sensational crime films released by Hong Kong studios in the 1970's. It released theatrically in America under the name Kung Fu Sting. The film has never been released on home video in America.

See also 

 Hong Kong Action Cinema

Citations

External links 

 
 HKMDB entry for Million Dollars Snatch

1970s action thriller films
Hong Kong action thriller films
Films set in Hong Kong
Hong Kong heist films
1970s Cantonese-language films
Hong Kong neo-noir films
1976 films
1970s Hong Kong films